Cornelia Collins Hussey (Collins; July 7, 1827 – October 13, 1902) was a 19th-century American philanthropist, suffragist, and writer. Her generous financial support had been indispensable to the New Jersey state association. Hussey died in 1902.

Early life
Cornelia Collins was born on Broadway, in New York City, at a point where the St. Nicholas Hotel now stands, July 7, 1827. Her father, Stacy Budd Collins, was born in Trenton, New Jersey, his father, Isaac Collins, having published the New Jersey Gazette. She was a descendant of Stephen Grillet and stated:— 

She was a member of the Society of Friends, to which sect her family have belonged for several generations. In early years, she was in sympathy with the anti-slavery movement, and before reaching her majority, became a manager of the Colored Orphan Asylum in her native city.

Career
On April 16, 1851, in New York, she married William H. Hussey, of New Bedford, Massachusetts. They have had three children, Dr. Mary H. Hussey (b. 1853), the devotee of woman suffrage, Frederick Hussey (b. 1856), and George Benjamin Hussey (b. 1863), a professor in the Western Maryland College.

In 1853, she became acquainted with Dr. Elizabeth Blackwell, who had just settled in medical practice in New York. Dr. Blackwell became Hussey's medical adviser. In that year, and for the first time in the world's history, poor women could consult a regularly graduated physician of their own sex at the dispensary that Blackwell established.  and some years afterwards, in cooperation with her and several other men and women, among whom was Cyrus West Field, she formed a body of trustees for the New York Infirmary for Women and Children (now, Lower Manhattan Hospital). The purpose of that society was to give poor women medical treatment at the hands of other women.  Also the Woman's Medical College was the outcome. From that hospital was developed in the course of time a medical college for women. Later, Hussey's only daughter studied her profession first in the college and then in the infirmary. In that hospital, she endowed a child's bed in the memory of her father.

The family moved to Orange, New Jersey. As her children grew up, Hussey took an active interest in the woman suffrage movement, and became a member of the executive committee of the American Woman Suffrage Association. Subsequently, on the request of Susan B. Anthony, she was made vice-president for New Jersey of the National Woman Suffrage Association. She retained those positions during a number of years. In 1876, efforts were made in several large cities to permit the licensing of the social evil, and Hussey, always interested in efforts for social purity, was chosen secretary of the committee formed to oppose such legislation.

When that work had been brought to a successful termination, Hussey became interested in the claim of Anna Ella Carroll for a government pension, on account of services rendered during the civil war. Hussey raised  for Carroll who planned the Tennessee Campaign, that is said to have brought the war to a close.  She afterwards aided in the support of Carroll. Through her efforts, considerable sums of money were raised by private subscription, and articles were published in some of the leading magazines on the work of Carroll. For at least two decades, Hussey contributed numerous articles to the Woman's Journal and various other reform periodicals, as well as to the papers of her State.

She was one of the fourteen original members of the Woman's Club of Orange, and a trustee of the New York Infirmary for Women and Children. She was a life member of the New Jersey Legal Aid Association and contributed the money to start it. She was one of the managers of the Colored Orphan Asylum in New York with President Roosevelt's mother, when it was unpopular to befriend African Americans. She was one of the founders of the American Purity Alliance and served as secretary and vice-president. She entertained Lucy Stone, Susan B. Anthony, Anna Howard Shaw, Carrie Chapman Catt, Amanda Deyo, and others. She contributed to the East Orange Flower Mission. Hussey was an honorary member of the National Woman Suffrage Association, a cause she had been devoted to for 33 years. She left them . She represented the organization in New Jersey as vice president. She contributed liberally to most of the charities in Orange.

In her private park, she entertained the “Little Mothers” from New York, the Whittier House kindergarten and other poor children. She entertained meetings of women physicians and lawyers, as well as woman suffrage meetings, and a meeting of the Society of New England Women, and Peace meetings to aid the Universal Peace Union. Hussey was a member of the Orange Political Study Club. She was a pronounced anti-slavery woman when William Lloyd Garrison was mobbed. She was attending a meeting when she was in terror for fear they would kill him.

She early took a life membership to the Universal Peace Union for peace. They had built for her a cottage in the Peace Grove at Mystic, Connecticut, which was named for herself and husband, “The William and Cornelia.” She then gave them .

Death and legacy
She had a very slight stroke of paralysis two years before her death, and again a few weeks before her death. On the evening of October 12, 1902, she was stricken with paralysis, and died on Monday morning, October 13, 1902. She was buried at Milton-on-the Hudson.

References

Attribution

External links
 

1827 births
1902 deaths
Philanthropists from New York (state)
Writers from New York City
19th-century American non-fiction writers
19th-century American women writers
American suffragists
People from Orange, New Jersey
19th-century American philanthropists
Wikipedia articles incorporating text from A Woman of the Century